Alexandru Ioanițiu (2 February 1890 – 17 September 1941) was a Romanian major general. He led Romanian troops against the Soviet Union during World War II, and was killed when he accidentally stepped into the moving propeller of his aircraft upon landing at an airport near Odessa while it was under siege.

Biography 
Ioanițiu was born in Botoșani, in northern Moldavia. He attended the military school in Iași, graduating as second lieutenant in 1910 and lieutenant in 1913. After Romania entered World War I on the side of the Allies, he fought in the Romanian Campaign of 1916 in Dobruja and at the Battle of the Argeș. He was promoted to captain in 1916 and major in 1917, and fought at the Battle of Mărășești. 

Afterwards he pursued his studies at the Higher War School in Bucharest (1919–1920). He was promoted to lieutenant colonel in 1928, to colonel in 1933, and to brigadier general in 1939. From May 1939 to September 1940 he was the commander of the Higher War School. Under his leadership, the first Romanian paratrooper company was created on 10 June 1940. Also in 1940, he was awarded the Order of the Crown, Commander rank.

From 6 September 1940, General Ioanițiu served as Chief of the Romanian General Staff. Romania joined Operation Barbarossa on 22 June 1941 in order to reclaim the lost territories of Bessarabia and Northern Bukovina, which had been annexed by the Soviet Union in June 1940. On 17 September he accompanied Marshal Ion Antonescu to the front, to oversee the Romanian offensive during the Siege of Odessa. Just after their Fieseler Fi 156 Storch plane landed at an airport in Baden, near Odessa, Ioanițiu was killed in a freak accident, hit by the plane's propeller.

He was promoted posthumously to major general, and was awarded post-mortem the Order of Michael the Brave, 3rd class, "for special merits on the battlefield as Chief of the General Staff." He is buried at Ghencea Cemetery, in Bucharest.

An alley in the city of Botoșani is named after him.

References

External links

1890 births
1941 deaths
People from Botoșani
Romanian Land Forces generals
Romanian military personnel of World War I
Carol I National Defence University alumni
Romanian military personnel killed in World War II
Recipients of the Order of Michael the Brave
Commanders of the Order of the Crown (Romania)
Chiefs of the General Staff of Romania
Victims of aviation accidents or incidents in Ukraine
Burials at Ghencea Cemetery
Academic staff of Carol I National Defence University
Victims of aviation accidents or incidents in 1941